Ida Ou Guelloul is a small town and rural commune in Essaouira Province of the Marrakech-Tensift-Al Haouz region of Morocco. In 2004, the commune had a total population of 6650 people living in 1053 households.

References

Populated places in Essaouira Province
Rural communes of Marrakesh-Safi